Get Lucky is the eleventh studio album by Australian group, Little River Band, released in April 1990, the album peaked at number 54 on the Australian ARIA Charts.

Track listing 
"If I Get Lucky" (Mike Chapman) – 4:12
"There's Not Another You" (Graham Goble) – 3:49
"Second Wind" (Dennis Lambert, Pam Reswick, Steve Werfel) – 4:14
"Every Time I Turn Around" (Peter Beckett, Lambert) – 4:35
"I Dream Alone" (Derek Pellicci, Glenn Shorrock) – 4:50
"Time and Eternity" (Goble) – 4:08
"Two Emotions" (Goble) – 4:28
"As Long as I'm Alive" (Goble, Matthew Nelson, Gunnar Nelson) – 4:35
"The One That Got Away" (Lambert, Wayne Nelson, Claude Gaudette) – 3:56
"Listen to Your Heart" (Tom Kelly, Billy Steinberg) – 4:51

Personnel 
Glenn Shorrock – lead vocals (tracks 1–6, 10)
Graham Goble – rhythm guitar, backing vocals
Derek Pellicci – drums
Stephen Housden – lead guitar
Wayne Nelson – bass, backing vocals; lead vocals (tracks 7–9)

Additional personnel
Claude Gaudette – keyboards, programming
Dennis Lambert – keyboards, programming
Jamie Paddle – keyboards, programming
John Robinson – additional drums

Charts

References 

1990 albums
Little River Band albums
MCA Records albums